McAllen is the largest city in Hidalgo County, Texas, United States, and the 22nd-most populous city in Texas. It is located at the southern tip of the state in the Rio Grande Valley, on the Mexico–United States border. The city limits extend south to the Rio Grande, across from the Mexican city of Reynosa. As of the 2020 census, McAllen's population was 142,210. It is the fifth-most populous metropolitan area (McAllen–Edinburg–Mission) in the state of Texas, and the binational Reynosa–McAllen metropolitan area counts a population of more than 1.5 million.

From its settlement in 1904, the area around McAllen was largely rural and agricultural in character, but the latter half of the 20th century had steady growth, which has continued in the 21st century in the metropolitan area. The introduction of the maquiladora economy and the North American Free Trade Association led to an increase in cross-border trading with Mexico.

History

In 1904, the Hidalgo and San Miguel Extension (now the Sam Fordyce Branch) of the St. Louis, Brownsville and Mexico Railway reached the Santa Anita Ranch. John McAllen and his son James had donated land to the railroad to guarantee it would cross this area. On December 5, 1904, the McAllen Townsite Company was formed by Uriah Lott, Leonidas C. Hill Sr., John McAllen, James Ballí McAllen, and John J. Young. The new community, which was named for John McAllen, had the depot nearest the county seat, Hidalgo,  to the south.

By 1911,  were under cultivation in East McAllen: commodity crops of cotton, alfalfa, broom corn, citrus fruits, grapes, and figs were raised. East McAllen had an estimated population of 1,000 that year, and West McAllen had ceased to exist. In 1911, the town applied for and was issued a charter of incorporation under the name McAllen. In 1916, 20,000 New York state troops were stationed at McAllen to help quell border disturbances related to the Mexican Civil War. The resulting economic boom increased the population from 1,200 in 1916 to 6,000 in 1920.

McAllen adopted a home rule charter in 1927. Canning factories, a winery, tortilla plants, wood-working plants, and some oil exploration increased the population to 9,074 by 1930. In 1936, Hiram Garner opened the Valley Distillery, Incorporated, which produced wines from citrus juices. The town was a petroleum and farm chemurgic center with a population of 11,877 in 1940, by which time it had adopted the nickname "The City of Palms". In 1941, a suspension bridge replaced the old bridge from Hidalgo to Reynosa in Tamaulipas; the new toll bridge was purchased by McAllen and was named the McAllen–Hidalgo–Reynosa International Bridge. Its construction resulted in increased tourist trade, making McAllen a winter resort and port of entry to Mexico.

The discovery of oil in the Reynosa area in 1947 attracted a large migration of people from the Mexican interior to jobs the region. They both constituted a new tourist market and a cheap labor supply for McAllen. The sister cities were linked as a result of the increased traffic between them. The population of McAllen was 20,005 in 1950 and 32,728 in 1960. In 1954 the McAllen–Hidalgo–Reynosa International Bridge was the number-two port of entry into Mexico.

McAllen was an agricultural, oil, and tourist center in 1970, when the population reached 37,636. By the start of the 1970s, McAllen had a 200-bed hospital and a new air-conditioned high school, the first school in the nation featuring on-site power generated by natural gas-powered turbines. The tourism industry continued to expand as people traveled to the area from both Mexico and the northern United States. The population continued to grow steadily through the 1970s, and reached 66,281 by 1980. During the late 1980s, the McAllen Foreign Trade Zone was an important general-purpose foreign trade zone. At the time, McAllen's main industries were retail, tourism and farming, and each was in trouble. The devaluation of the Mexican peso in the 1980s put a damper on cross-border shopping; local tourism was down because of the recession. In 1983, a freeze took out much of the valley's citrus crop.

In the mid-1980s, fueled by trade and the growth of the maquiladora (in which components are shipped to Mexico from the United States, assembled, and shipped back as finished products), the economy began to improve in Hidalgo County. McAllen sits across the border from Reynosa, a large manufacturing center. After the peso devalued, Mexico was more successful in attracting companies to run their plants in Mexico, with support operations in Texas.

Border crossing is a daily event for many and is a key component in the local economy. The city became a focal point for concerns about the border during the United States federal government shutdown of 2018–2019 over the Mexico–United States barrier. President Donald Trump held a briefing with the border agents at the patrol station here in January 2019. Homeland Security Secretary Kirstjen Nielsen also visited the Border Patrol station in March 2019. In order to deal with overcrowded facilities in 2019 resulting from the arrival of Central American migrant caravans, immigration authorities were releasing a few hundred asylum seekers daily to private groups that assist them with basic needs and travel arrangements.

The mayor emphasized how safe and secure the city is when U.S military troops were mobilized in the city to help the Border Patrol. Portions of the razor wire coils considered unnecessary by the city were removed after troops had placed it at the border. The troops assisted by using military helicopters to carry border patrol agents to and from locations along the Mexico–United States border and by maintaining vehicles. During these border support activities, they are prohibited from law enforcement activities, such as detaining migrants or seizing drugs. U.S. military troops are prohibited from carrying out law enforcement duties. The Marine Corps Commandant General Robert Neller expressed concerns about the impact of continuing border support on combat readiness for the troops.

Geography
McAllen is located in southern Hidalgo County at  (26.216263, −98.236385). It is bordered to the southwest by Granjeno; to the west by Mission, Palmhurst, and Alton; to the north by Edinburg, the Hidalgo county seat; to the east by Pharr; and to the south by Hidalgo. The McAllen city limits extend to the southwest as far as the Rio Grande, directly north of Reynosa, Tamaulipas, in Mexico.

Although McAllen is named the "City of Palms", tropical vegetation is only locally dominant. Many thorny shrubs and deciduous trees occur in the area, such as the Rio Grande ash (Fraxinus berlandieriana), cedar elm (Ulmus crassifolia), and honey mesquite (Prosopis glandulosa).

Climate
McAllen, like much of South Texas, has a subtropical climate. Under the Köppen climate classification, the city features a hot semiarid climate (BSh), featuring long, very hot and humid summers, and brief, warm winters. The city has two distinct seasons; a wet season from May to October and a dry season from November to April. The warm season is extremely long, as average high temperatures from May through September are above  and average low temperatures are above , with relatively high dew point values, resulting in higher relative humidity values and heat index values. Heat indices consistently reach over  during these months. Winter temperatures in McAllen and surrounding Rio Grande Valley are some of the warmest in the contiguous United States outside of South Florida, and comparable to the Coachella and Imperial valleys and Yuma Desert, but with warmer nighttime lows and higher dew points.

Most precipitation occurs in the warm season, with the least precipitation distinctly occurring in the cooler winter. As September is the peak of the north Atlantic hurricane season and tropical storms and hurricanes occasionally drop copious amounts of rainfall on the region, this month tends by far to be the wettest, averaging  of rain. The driest month is February, with only  of precipitation. Since 1941, it has snowed twice, once when the city received  on December 25, 2004.

Temperatures consistently rise above  from June through August, with exceptionally high humidity.

While usually a hot, humid, but relatively dry climate, McAllen, Texas has received unusual weather phenomena. In 2013, McAllen, Texas received a large hail storm that destroyed many vehicles and buildings. The storm came suddenly and many people were unprepared. In December 2017, McAllen received almost 3 inches of snow, nearly 13 years after the previous snowfall which took place during the 2004 Christmas Eve United States winter storm. Despite these fluke weather events, McAllen is prone to tropical storms, hurricanes such as Hurricane Dolly (2008) and Hurricane Hanna (2020), and heatwaves.

Demographics

2020 census

As of the 2020 United States census, there were 142,210 people, 45,429 households, and 34,119 families residing in the city.

2010 census
As of the census of 2010, 129,877 people, 41,573 households, and 31,823 families resided in the city. Of the 45,862 housing units,  4,289, or 9.4%, were vacant.

The racial makeup of the city was 83.9% White, 0.9% African American, 0.4% Native American, 2.6% Asian, 0.02% Pacific Islander, 10.4% some other race, and 1.8% from two or more races. Hispanics or Latinos of any race were 84.6% of the population.

Of the 41,573 households, 46.0% had children under the age of 18 living with them, 52.2% were married couples living together, 19.0% had a female householder with no husband present, and 23.5% were not families. About 19.1% of all households were made up of individuals, and 23.9% were someone living alone who was 65 years of age or older. The average household size was 3.10, and the average family size was 3.58.

In the city, the population was distributed as 30.1% under the age of 18, 9.6% from 18 to 24, 28.1% from 25 to 44, 21.3% from 45 to 64, and 10.9% 65 years of age or older. The median age was 32.2 years. For every 100 females, there were 91.5 males. For every 100 females age 18 and over, there were 87.2 males.

For the period 2012–2016, the estimated median annual income for a household in the city was $45,568, and for a family was $50,184. The per capita income for the city was $21,726. About 22.5% of families and 25.7% of the entire population were below the poverty line, including 36.6% of those under age 18 and 21.4% of those age 65 or over.

Crime
Based on the Texas Department of Public Safety's Annual Crime in Texas report and the FBI's Crime in the United States report, there were zero (0) murders reported during 2018. The city has been consistently ranked among the safest cities in Texas.

Health
McAllen was the focus of a 2009 article in The New Yorker by Atul Gawande entitled "The Cost Conundrum", an inquiry into the factors that contribute to the cost of health care. The McAllen area had the highest taxpayer-sponsored spending per beneficiary in the United States, despite areas with similar demographics and health profiles having half the cost per recipient. The article noted that while the area has a higher prevalence of obesity and diabetes, its rates of infant mortality, HIV, and tobacco use were lower than the national average.

McAllen was the most obese metropolitan area in the country in 2012, with 38.5% of the adult population considered obese. The high obesity rate has likely contributed to area residents' poor health. More than 21% of the population has been diagnosed with diabetes, more than any other metro area in the United States. Poverty may play a large role in the community's health problems, as well. Over 25% of the city population was living below the poverty line during the period 2012–2016. More than 29% of the population also lacked health coverage during that time.

McAllen is featured in Supersize vs Superskinny, a British television programme on Channel 4 that features information about dieting and extreme eating lifestyles. One of the main show features is a weekly comparison between an overweight person and an underweight person. In the show, the overweight participant visits morbidly obese McAllen residents to find motivation for lifestyle and diet changes.

Economy
The Rio Grande Valley began its rapid development with the introduction of irrigation in 1898 and the construction of the railroad in 1904. These major additions turned a once relatively desolate area into a major agricultural center. Throughout much of the 1900s, McAllen was a rural, agriculture-based economy characterized by sporadic growth.

Today, the area is transforming into a major international trade area. As recently as 1990, McAllen's unemployment rate was at 22.6%. By the end of 2005, that figure had dropped to 7.7%. However, in 2011, census.gov listed the McAllen metro area the poorest in the nation. As of 2012, the average cost of a home in McAllen was the third-least expensive in the country, at $178,000, while average monthly rent for a two-bedroom apartment was $708. In 2012, the cost of living in McAllen was 16.2% lower than the national average.

Trade
Since the 1980s and especially since the ratification of the North American Free Trade Agreement in 1994, the focal point of economic activity has shifted from agriculture to international trade, health care, retail, and tourism.

The McAllen Foreign-Trade Zone (FTZ) is located south of McAllen between McAllen and Reynosa. Commissioned in 1973, it was the first inland foreign-trade zone in the United States. Also, an FTZ designation site is at the McAllen Miller International Airport to facilitate air cargo needs. Under U.S. and Mexican laws and NAFTA provisions, the FTZ designation offers specific cost-saving opportunities to manufacturers. Products can be brought into the FTZ duty-free. Services have recently expanded to include full logistic support services, including public warehouse services such as pick and pack, order processing, inventory control, incoming/outgoing quality inspection, and kitting.

Sports
McAllen hosted the NAIA National Football Championship in the late 1970s and NCAA Division II national football championship games in the 1980s.

Until 2014, McAllen was home to the Texas Thunder of the independent United League Baseball, who played at Edinburg Stadium.

Recreation

Birdwatching

McAllen is positioned on a major flyway, the migratory path of birds between North and South America, presenting opportunities for bird and butterfly expeditions. The landscape hosts a diverse wildlife population. The Quinta Mazatlan, a historic Spanish colonial mansion, is used as McAllen's wing of the World Birding Center.

The Bicentennial Bike Path runs from Highway 83 on the south side to Bicentennial and Trenton Road on the north side. The International Museum of Art & Science, Smithsonian affiliate and AAM-accredited museum founded in 1967, is located near the path at the corner of Bicentennial and Nolana Avenue.

The Zinnia Spray Water Park is McAllen's first sprayground park. It is located at 29th and Zinnia Ave.

Palm View Golf Course is located on South Ware Road just south of Highway 83. The golf course has 18 holes plus a driving range. This course hosts numerous tournaments year round.

Dog owners have room to run their pets at the McAllen Dog Park, which is divided into two sections.

Government

 Frank W. Crow, 1911–1913
 O. P. Archer, 1913–1923
 F.B. Freeland, 1923–1929
 Frank E. Osborn, 1929–1931
 John Ewing, 1931–1934
 A.L. Landry, 1935–1937
 Horace Etchison, 1937–1944
 Dr. Frank Osborn, 1944–1945
 Allen F. Vannoy, 1945–1947
 T. B. Waite, Jr., 1947–1948
 C. W. Davis, 1949–1952
 Angus McLeod, 1952–1953
 Phillip Boeye, 1953–1961
 Robert F. Barnes, 1961–1963
 Paul G. Veale, 1963–1969
 Jack Whetsel, 1969–1977
 Othal E. Brand, 1977–1997
 Leo Montalvo, 1997–2005
 Richard F. Cortez, 2005–2013
 James E. Darling, 2013–2021
 Javier Villalobos, 2021–Present

The Texas Department of Criminal Justice operates an office in McAllen.

Federal representation

The United States District Court for the Southern District of Texas McAllen Division is located at Bentsen Tower 1701 W. Hwy. 83, Suite 1011, McAllen, Texas.

The United States Postal Service operates two post offices in McAllen: McAllen Post Office, located at 620 Pecan Blvd, and the McAllen Downtown Post Office at 406 12th Street.

The United States Border Patrol McAllen Station is located at 3000 West Military Highway.

The United States Border Patrol Central Processing Center is located at 3700 W Ursula Avenue, McAllen, Texas.

The 2LT Luis G. Garcia United States Army Reserve Center located at 600 S Col Rowe Blvd is home for the United States Army Reserve 961st Quartermaster Company, 461st Transportation Detachment, and 519th Transportation Detachment.

McAllen is represented in the United States House of Representatives by two Democrats: Vicente Gonzalez of the 15th Congressional District, and Henry Cuellar of the 28th Congressional District.

Transportation

Mass transit

Metro McAllen (formerly McAllen Express Transit – MET) has provided public transportation for the City of McAllen since June 1997. In the beginning, McAllen Express was administered by the Lower Rio Grande Valley Development Council. Since 2005, Metro McAllen has been operated as a department of the city of McAllen. Metro McAllen now has nine fixed routes and paratransit, serving residents and visitors. It operates seven days a week, from 6am–9pm Monday through Saturday and from 8am-6pm on Sunday. LRGVDC continues to operate regional buses under the name Valley Metro.

Downtown Bus Terminal

The City of McAllen also operates the bus terminal facility in downtown McAllen, known as McAllen Central Station. Central Station serves as a hub for MET and for 14 private domestic and international bus lines. Around 60 buses depart from Central Station on a daily basis. It is centrally located in downtown McAllen at 1501 W Hwy 83.

Highways

 Interstate 2 travels through McAllen from Taylor Road to Sugar Road.
 U.S. 83 travels through McAllen as its major east–west artery. It runs directly south of downtown McAllen.
 State Highway 107 travels east through McAllen into downtown Edinburg, where it intersects the Business Route of US Route 281 and then I-69C/US 281.
 State Highway 336 travels north to an intersection with FM 1016 in McAllen to an intersection with I-2/US 83.
 State Highway 495 travels through McAllen from FM 2220 (Ware Road) to FM 2061 (McColl Street).

Airports

 McAllen Miller International Airport is served by American Airlines with non-stop service to Dallas/Fort Worth; by United with non-stop service to Houston; by Aeromar with nonstop service to Mexico City; and by Allegiant Air with nonstop flights to Las Vegas and with seasonal service to Los Angeles and Orlando-Sanford.

Education

Postsecondary
 South Texas College has a total of more than 27,000 students attending its five campuses in Hidalgo and Starr counties, and the eSTC virtual campus. The main campus is in McAllen.

Primary and secondary schools

The McAllen Independent School District serves most of the city followed by the Valley View Independent School District and the Sharyland Independent School District. Portions of the city extend into the Edinburg Consolidated Independent School District, which operates two elementary schools within the McAllen city limits. The Hidalgo Independent School District, Pharr-San Juan-Alamo Independent School District also serve McAllen.

In addition, residents are allowed to apply to magnet schools operated by the South Texas Independent School District.

The Catholic Diocese of Brownsville operates Our Lady of Sorrows School, an elementary and middle school.

Public libraries
McAllen Public Library operates a main library and two branches, the Lark Branch and the Palm View Branch. The New Main Library opened in the fall of 2011 inside a former Walmart big box store. The library earned high praise and received the International Interior Design Association's 2012 Library Interior Design Award.

Arts and culture

International Museum of Art & Science (IMAS), founded in 1967, is a Smithsonian Affiliate and American Alliance of Museums (AAM) accredited museum located in McAllen at the corner of Bicentennial and Nolana Avenue.

Media

Television stations

 KGBT-TV 4 Harlingen, Texas Independent
 KRGV-TV 5 Weslaco, Texas ABC
 XHAB-TV 8 Matamoros, Tamaulipas Vallevision
 XERV-TV 9 Reynosa, Tamaulipas Canal de las Estrellas
 XHREY-TV 12 Reynosa, Tamaulipas Azteca Uno
 XHOR-TV 14 Reynosa, Tamaulipas Azteca 7
 KVEO 23 Brownsville, Texas NBC/CBS
 KTFV-CD 32 McAllen, Texas UniMás
 KTLM 40 Rio Grande City, Texas Telemundo
 KNVO 48 McAllen, Texas Univision
 XHVTV-TV 54 Reynosa, Tamaulipas Multimedios (Canal 6 Mexico)
 KFXV 60 Harlingen, Texas FOX
 KMBH-LD 67 McAllen, Texas FOX
 [ MCN ] 17.12 McAllen, Texas Public Broadcasting Station

Radio stations
 KURV 710 AM News Talk Radio
 XERDO-AM La Raza 1060 AM (Regional Mexican) [Spanish]
 XEMS-AM Radio Mexicana 1490 AM (Regional Mexican) [Spanish]
 KHID 88.1 FM McAllen  (National Public Radio)
 XHRYS-FM Hits FM 90.1 FM (Top 40 Hits) [Spanish]
 XHRYN-FM Uni 90.5 FM [Spanish]
 XHRYA-FM Mas Musica 90.9 FM (Hit Radio) [Spanish]
 XHMLS-FM Exitos 91.3 FM (All-Time Hits) [Spanish]
 KCAS The New KCAS 91.5 FM
 XHEOQ-FM Notigape 91.7 FM (News) [Spanish]
 XHAAA-FM La Caliente 93.1 FM (Regional Mexican) [Spanish]
 KFRQ Q94.5 FM (Classic/Modern/Hard Rock)
 XHRT-FM Xtrema 95.3 FM (All-Time Hits) [Spanish]
 KBTQ Recuerdo 96.1 FM (Oldies) [Spanish]
 KVMV Family Friendly & Commercial Free 96.9 FM (Adult Contemporary Christian)
 KGBT-FM Solamente Exitos 98.5 FM (Regional Mexican) [Spanish]
 KKPS La Nueva 99.5 FM (Local Tejano Music) [Spanish]
 KTEX South Texas Country 100.3 FM (Country)
 KNVO-FM Jose 101.1 FM [Spanish]
 XHAVO-FM Digital 101.5 FM (International Music) [Spanish]
 KBFM Wild 104.1 FM (Hip-Hop/R&B/Reggaeton)
 KJAV 104.9 FM Ultra 104.9 ("Sonamos Diferente")(Classic Hits)
 KQXX The X 105.5 FM (Classic rock)
 KHKZ Kiss 106.3 FM (Hot AC)
 XHVTH-FM La Mas Buena 107.1 FM (Regional Mexican) 
 KVLY Mix 107.9 FM (Top 40)

Area newspapers
 The Monitor 
 Valley Morning Star
 Texas Border Business
 Mega Doctor News

Architecture and points of interest

 Tallest buildings

 Districts

 Downtown McAllen
 De Palmas Historic District
 17 Street Entertainment District
 McAllen Arts District
 Uptown McAllen
 McAllen Convention Center District

 Points of Interest

 McAllen Botanical Gardens
 Quinta Mazatlan
 McAllen Convention Center
 La Plaza Mall
 International Museum of Art and Science
 Historic Cine El Rey Theatre
Veteran's War Memorial of Texas

Notable people 

 Cristela Alonzo, stand-up comedian and actress, was given the Key to the City in 2019.
 Abraham Ancer, professional golfer, born in McAllen
 Jorge Cantú, baseball player, born in McAllen in 1982
 Shaine Casas, competitive swimmer, born in San Diego, California, raised in McAllen
 Raúl Castillo, actor, born in McAllen in 1977
 Michael Cole, professional wrestling commentator for WWE
 Ana Brenda Contreras, Mexican American actress and singer, born in McAllen on December 24, 1986
 Henry Cuesta, clarinetist on The Lawrence Welk Show, born in McAllen in 1931
 Catherine Hardwicke, film director, born in Cameron, Texas, grew up in McAllen
 James Nicholas Rowe, Colonel United States Army, born in McAllen in 1938
 Gloria Trevi Mexican pop star, born in Monterrey, Nuevo Leon, México. Now living in McAllen Texas
 Carl Möhner, actor, director, screenwriter and painter born in Vienna, Austria in 1921, died 2005 in McAllen.

Notes

Footnotes

Citations

Bibliography

External links

 City of McAllen official website
 McAllen Convention and Visitors Bureau
 The Handbook of Texas Online

 
1904 establishments in Texas
Cities in Hidalgo County, Texas
Cities in Texas
Populated places established in 1904
Texas populated places on the Rio Grande